The Women's Individual C5 Pursuit took place on 30 August 2012 at the London Velopark.

The event began with a qualifying race over 3000m. Each of the ten athletes competed individually in a time-trial basis. The fastest two riders raced for the gold medal and the third- and fourth-fastest riders raced for the bronze.

Preliminaries
Q = Qualifier
WR = World Record

Finals 
Gold medal match

Bronze medal match

References

Women's pursuit C5